Hamdan Qassem (Arabic:حمدان قاسم) (born 2 October 1988) is an Emirati footballer. He currently plays as a left back.

External links

References

Emirati footballers
1988 births
Living people
Al Ahli Club (Dubai) players
Al Shabab Al Arabi Club Dubai players
Emirates Club players
Sharjah FC players
Hatta Club players
Dibba FC players
Fujairah FC players
Al Bataeh Club players
Dibba Al-Hisn Sports Club players
Emirati people of Baloch descent
UAE Pro League players
Association football defenders